Cushman is both a surname and a given name. Notable people with the name include:

Surname:
 Austin F. Cushman (1830–1914), American tool inventor
 Charlie Cushman (1850–1909), American baseball umpire and manager
 Charlotte Cushman (1816–1876), American stage actress 
 Doug Cushman (born 1953), American cartoonist
 Francis W. Cushman (1867–1909), American politician
 Jeremy Cushman (born 1990), American violinist
 Joseph Augustine Cushman (1881–1949) American paleontologist
Harvey Cushman (1877-1920) baseball player
 Karen Cushman (born 1941), American writer
Leah Cushman, American politician
Mary Floyd Cushman (1870 - 1965), American medical doctor and missionary
 Pauline Cushman (1833–1897), American actress and Civil War spy
 Robert Cushman (1578–1625), Plymouth Colony Pilgrim
 R. A. Cushman (1880–1957), American entomologist
 Robert E. Cushman Jr. (1914–1985), U.S. Marine Corps general
 Robert H. Cushman (1924–1996), engineering journalist
 Robert Cushman (curator) (1946–2009), photography curator for the Academy of Motion Picture Arts and Sciences
Susan Cushman (born 1972), Canadian rhythmic gymnast

Given name:
 Cushman Kellogg Davis (1838–1900), American politician
 Arthur Cushman McGiffert (1861–1933), American theologian
 Robert Cushman Murphy  (1887–1973), American ornithologist

Fictional characters:

 Frank Cushman, fictional character in the film Jerry Maguire; portrayed by Jerry O'Connell